Joseph-Hormisdas Legris (May 6, 1850 – March 6, 1932) was a politician in Quebec, Canada. He served as Member of the Legislative Assembly (MLA), Member of Parliament (MP) and Senator.

Early life

He was born on May 6, 1850, in Louiseville, Mauricie. He was a farmer and an army officer of the local army reserve.

Provincial politics

Legris ran as a candidate of Honoré Mercier's Parti National in 1886 and lost.  However, the election was eventually declared void and a by-election was called to settle the matter. Legris ended up winning the 1888 by-election and became MLA for the provincial district of Maskinongé.

In 1890 though, his own election was cancelled. The same year, Catholic Bishop Louis-François Richer Laflèche used his influence to help local candidates of the Conservative Party being elected.  Legris lost re-election against Joseph Lessard.

Federal politics

In 1891, Legris was elected as a Liberal candidate to the House of Commons, representing the district of Maskinongé. He was re-elected in 1896 and 1900.

He resigned in 1903 to accept an appointment to the Canadian Senate.

City politics

He served as Mayor of Louiseville from 1921 to 1922.

Death

He died in office on March 6, 1932, in Ottawa, Ontario.

References

1850 births
1932 deaths
Canadian senators from Quebec
Liberal Party of Canada MPs
Liberal Party of Canada senators
Mayors of places in Quebec
Members of the House of Commons of Canada from Quebec
Quebec Liberal Party MNAs
People from Louiseville
Canadian Roman Catholics